The LSWR H16 class were five 4-6-2T tank locomotives designed by Robert Urie for the London and South Western Railway (LSWR) in 1921–1922. They were the last new design for the LSWR and their only Pacific-type design.

Background
As part of the project to construct a marshalling yard at Feltham in West London, Urie produced two locomotive designs, the G16 "Black Tanks" to shunt the new yard, and the H16 "Green Tanks" to work transfer freights to the London area yards of the other railway companies.

Construction history

Livery and numbering

LSWR and Southern Railway
When originally built they were numbered 516–520. On passing to the Southern Railway, they had their LSWR numbers prefixed with an ‘E’. The locomotives lost the prefix between 1931–32. The Southern Railway painted the H16 class in passenger green paint, rather than goods engine black.

Post-1948 (nationalisation)
All five engines were passed to British Railways, who renumbered them 30516–30520. All were withdrawn in 1962, and scrapped.

References

Notes

Bibliography

  

H16
4-6-2T locomotives
Railway locomotives introduced in 1921
Scrapped locomotives
Standard gauge steam locomotives of Great Britain